Faraz Anwar  (Urdu: فراز انور; b.15 July 1976) is a Pakistani musician, composer, singer-songwriter, bandleader, and a guitarist who founded the Mizraab, a heavy metal music and hard rock genre band based in Pakistan. His musical act on electric guitar has been described by one critic as "Pakistan's master of progressive rock". Anwar is currently signed to Lion Music, which is a Finnish production and record label company.

Biography

Anwar was born in Karachi, Pakistan on 15 July 1976.

Solo discography
2001: Abstract Point of View
5 June 2020:Ishq Ki Subah

Discography

With Mizraab 
Panchi (1999)
Maazi, Haal, Mustaqbil (2004)

Solo albums 
Abstract Point of View (2001)
  Ishq Ki Subah](5 June 2020)

Live albums 
Live at the Rock Musicarium  (2012)

References

External links

Official fan site

1977 births
Living people
Muhajir people
People from Karachi
Musicians from Karachi
Pakistani rock guitarists
University of Karachi alumni
Mizraab members
Pakistani heavy metal guitarists
Lead guitarists